Energistics is a global, non-profit, industry consortium that facilitates an inclusive user community for the development, adoption and maintenance of collaborative, open standards for the energy industry in general and specifically for oil and gas exploration and production.

Overview 

The open standards that Energistics encourages the industry to use deliver business value to the upstream oil and natural gas industry through business process efficiencies across the entire exploration and production life cycle. Energistics is a membership organization. The work of the consortium concentrates on helping upstream oil and natural gas companies through the development, support, and promotion of standards that address data definition, handling, storage, and exchange in the context of technology, computing, communications, and business processes.

Regions

Regions are a means of building local Energistics communities around the world, with local activities and events. There are eight regions: Africa, Asia Pacific, Eastern Europe, Latin America, Middle East, North America, South Asia, and Western Europe.

History

The predecessor of Energistics was formed in October 1990 by five founding sponsor oil companies: BP, Chevron, Elf (since merged into Total), Mobil (since merged into ExxonMobil), and Texaco (since merged into Chevron) under the name Petrotechnical Open Software Corporation (POSC).

The mission of the new organization was defined as developing, supporting, evolving, and promoting open standards for the scientific, engineering, and operations aspects of the oil and gas exploration and production industry, known as Energy eStandards.

In the early years, the organization established an open process, acquired resources, and pursued a set of deliverables. The use of the specifications was intended to enable greater quality, consistency, and integration of data and data use. The initial deliverables were known as the Software Integration Platform (SIP) Specifications.

In 1993, Version 1.0 of the specifications were published as a collection of hard-cover bound books. The published specifications included base computing, data model, data access, data exchange, and user interface.

During the next three years, the organization engaged in educational, testing and support activities, including two proof-of-concept implementations of the SIP enabling middleware and a multi-stage, multi-member pilot implementation program called the Industry Implementation Pilot (IIP). The IIP involved both energy company in-house developers and commercial vendor developers building up aspects of an infill drilling scenario.

In 1996, the board of directors commissioned a study of the benefits of using the SIP specifications, which projected savings of US$1–3 per barrel of oil gained through improvements in data quality, data accessibility, and exploitation of information and knowledge.

Additions and enhancements to the SIP specifications were published in the following few years, including SIP Version 2.2 in 1997 and software applications interoperability specifications in 1999. During these years, the organization transitioned to a fully member-elected board of directors.

The SIP Version 2.3 incremental update came out in 2000 and 2001, along with the first XML data schema specifications for basic well data (WellMasterML) and well log display parameters (LogGraphicsML) as well as a series of XML-oriented public seminars. The future course of the organization was shifting from data store and middleware specifications to subject matter data exchange specifications.

This transition progress in 2002 with the agreement to receive custodianship of the WITSML Standards for drilling data exchange based on XML and Web Services technologies. In the same year, the first of a number of member Special Interest Groups (SIGs) was organized as the user community for subject-specific standards. The subject matter of the first SIG was E&P data stores and their use.

In 2003, a SIG was formed to support the WITSML Standards. The final release of the SIP Specifications, Version 3.0, came out during that year. Reference standards for both well log data and E&P document and dataset cataloging were published, along with an E&P business process reference model.

During 2004, the organization decided to improve the alignment of its name with its mission by redefining the meaning of the name POSC to mean the Petrotechnical Open Standards Consortium.

The second XML and Web Services family of standards was initiated in August 2005 with the agreement to host the first year of the PRODML, Production XML Markup Language initiative, after which the PRODML SIG was formed. A major new release of the WITSML Standards was released in 2005. Also, an open source data conversion utility for LAS to WITSML well log dataset conversion was developed and released.

Building on the most valuable initiatives and an increased emphasis on wide-scale standards adoption, the organization rebranded itself as Energistics in November 2006. This coincided with the release of Version 1.0 of the PRODML Standards and an update to Units of Measure specifications.

In 2007, a WITSML-based electronic permitting XML schema specifications was published following a multi-year collaboration with US state regulatory agencies in cooperation with API PIDX's REGS EC User Group.

During 2008, WITSML Standards, Version 1.4.0 were released. Also, updated application interoperability specifications were submitted by OpenSpirit Corporation, which followed from the previous work in the area published originally in 1999.

2009 saw the formation of the RESQML SIG to address reservoir characterization standards development as a natural successor to the RESCUE Work Group's C++ Class Library. Also, updated PRODML Standards for both data and services specifications were released.

In 2011 the Standards DevKit was developed by ExxonMobil and is licensed to Energistics for maintenance, support and administration. The DevKit supports the latest versions of WITSML, PRODML and RESQML. Further development will be guided by Energistics and the user community.

In early 2012, Energistics, along with 11 other standards organizations, formed the Standards Leadership Council (SLC). The intent of the SLC is to formally unite the leaders of organizations that provide open and freely-available standards to the upstream oil and natural gas industry.
 
WITSML v1.4.1.1 was published in July 2012 and includes updates and bug fixes to v1.4.1 (published in 2011). A certification program for v1.4.1.1 servers is under development.

In May 2014, the Energy Industry Profile (EIP) Metadata Standard was published. EIP is an open, non-proprietary metadata exchange standard designed to document structured and unstructured information resources of importance to members of the energy community and to maximize metadata interoperability within the industry.

In July 2014, the Unit of Measure Standard V1.0 was published. This includes the Unit of Measure Dictionary and the Unit Symbol Grammar Specification. Contributors to this standard include the Energistics community, The Professional Petroleum Data Management (PPDM™) Association and the Society of Exploration Geophysicists (SEG). Also published in 2014 was the Energy Industry Profile (EIP) v1.0 of ISO 19115-1. During the summer and fall of 2014, PRODML v1.3 and RESQML v2.0 were published.

In 2015, a game changer standard was published - Energistics Transfer Protocol (ETP) v1.0 was released to the industry. ETP enables the efficient transfer of data between applications and is a part of the Common Technical Architecture (CTA) used by WITSML, RESQML and PRODML.

References

External links
 Energistics Website
 PRODML Standards Website
 WITSML Standards Website
 archival POSC Standards Website
 Standards Leadership Council (SLC) Website

Energy organizations